Robert H. Hewsen (born Robert H. Hewsenian; May 20, 1934 – November 17, 2018) was an Armenian-American historian and professor of history at Rowan University. He was an expert on the ancient history of the South Caucasus. Hewsen is the author of Armenia: A Historical Atlas (2001), a major reference book, acclaimed as an important achievement in Armenian studies.

Biography
Hewsen was born Robert H. Hewsenian in New York City in 1934 to Armenian American parents.  He spent seven years in Europe with the US Air Force and studying. He received his B.A. in history from the University of Maryland and his Ph.D. from Georgetown University in 1967. The same year he joined the history department of Rowan University, where he taught Byzantine and Russian history for more than 30 years. After retiring from Rowan University in July 1999, Professor Hewsen lectured at University of Chicago, Columbia University, California State University, Fresno and University of California, Los Angeles.

Professor Hewsen was also the co-founder and president of the Society for the Study of Caucasia.

Works
Hewsen wrote many books and articles on the history of the Caucasus, especially Armenia. His seminal contribution to the field is Armenia: A Historical Atlas (2001). The book received wide critical acclaim. In his review Michael E. Stone wrote: "Robert Hewsen has prepared an opus magnum that has no rival in Armenian studies. This pioneering and largely definitive work is the best atlas of Armenia ever prepared." Merrill D. Peterson wrote that it "may by itself be considered a monument of American scholarship." Charles King wrote that the book is an "outstanding achievement not only as a geographical reference but also as a guide to the demographic and political history of the entire Caucasus." Adam T. Smith wrote of the Atlas as "an important milestone in the development of Armenian studies." Anthony Kaldellis stated that "For the historical geography of Armenia, the maps in Hewsen, Armenia, are invaluable."

Books

Book chapters

Articles 

Anatolia and Historical Concepts // The California Institute for Ancient Studies, a Velikovskian site
North Central Armenia, I: The Principality of Tayk. (Article, perhaps unpublished)

References

External links 
 Robert H. Hewsen Appointed Henry S. Khanzadian Kazan Visiting Professor for Fall 2001 at Fresno State.

Armenian studies scholars
American people of Armenian descent
University of Maryland, College Park alumni
Georgetown University alumni
Rowan University faculty
1934 births
2018 deaths